Michael Martin Murphey is the self titled tenth studio album by American singer-songwriter Michael Martin Murphey and his first for Liberty Records. The album peaked at number 14 on the Billboard Top Country Albums chart.

Track listing

Credits
Music
 Michael Martin Murphey – vocals, guitar, piano, harmonica
 John Leslie Hug – guitar
 Fred Tackett – guitar
 Michael Hearne – guitar
 James Burton – guitar
 Carmen Acciaioli – steel guitar
 Jay Dee Maness – steel guitar
 Lance Ong – synthesizer
 Brian Whitcomb – keyboards
 John Hickman – banjo
 Byron Berline – violin
 Leland Sklar – bass
 David McDaniels – bass
 Mike Botts – drums
 Buzzy Buchanan – drums
 Herb Pedersen – background vocals
 Chris Montan – background vocals
 Denny Brooks – background vocals
 Joey Scarbury – background vocals
 Harry Stinson – background vocals
 Jennifer Warnes – background vocals

Production
 Bill Burks – artwork
 Jonathan Louie – artwork (back cover)
 Glenn Grab – contractor (strings)
 Eric Prestidge – engineer, mixing
 Ken Perry – mastering
 Richard McKernan – mixing
 Mary Maciukas – photography
 Jim Ed Norman – producer
 John Rosenthal – recording
 Russ Castillo – recording

Chart performance

References

External links
 Michael Martin Murphey's Official Website

1982 albums
Michael Martin Murphey albums
Liberty Records albums